Job Osborne (26 April 1842 – 31 January 1931) was a New Zealand farmer, contractor and well-sinker. He was born in Road, Somerset, England, in 1842.

References

1842 births
1931 deaths
People from Somerset
English emigrants to New Zealand
Local politicians in New Zealand